Andrei Kareyev (born November 19, 1994) is a Russian professional ice hockey goaltender. He is currently playing with Salavat Yulaev Ufa in the Kontinental Hockey League (KHL).

Kareyev made his KHL debut playing with Metallurg Novokuznetsk during the 2014–15 KHL season.

Following two seasons in the Finnish Liiga with HC TPS, Kareyev returned to Russia and re-joined previous club, Salavat Yulaev Ufa of the KHL, on 3 June 2022.

References

External links

1994 births
Living people
Kuznetskie Medvedi players
Metallurg Novokuznetsk players
HC Neftekhimik Nizhnekamsk players
Russian ice hockey goaltenders
Salavat Yulaev Ufa players
Ice hockey people from Moscow
Toros Neftekamsk players
HC TPS players
Zauralie Kurgan players